Chronogastridae is a family of nematodes belonging to the order Plectida.

Genera:
 Caribplectus Andrássy, 1973
 Keralanema Siddiqi, 2003
 Kischkenema Siddiqi, Winiszewska & Malewski, 2013
 Rugoster Siddiqi, Handoo & Siddiqi, 2013

References

Nematodes